The Jūra is a river in Lithuania and a right tributary of the Nemunas (Neman). It mostly follows a meandering and natural course, although two concrete dams of hydroelectric power plants prevent paddling, as do dense vegetation in its upper reaches and large stones.

The river's name comes from the Lithuanian word jūra, which means "sea". Towns on the Jūra include Tauragė, Rietavas, Kvėdarna, and Pajūris.

Tributary rivers 
 left - Aitra, Lokysta, Akmena, Šunija, Šešuvis.
 right - Letausas, Šlaunis.

Rivers of Lithuania